The Schlect House is a Shingle Style house at 5804 West Race Avenue in Chicago, Illinois, United States.  The house was built in 1887 by Fredrick R. Schlock for his aunt Catherine Schlect. It was designated a Chicago Landmark on January 20, 1999.

References

Houses completed in 1887
Houses in Chicago
Chicago Landmarks
Shingle Style houses
1887 establishments in Illinois
Shingle Style architecture in Illinois